Hitler—Beast of Berlin (1939) was one of the most popular "hiss and boo" films of the World War II era, based on the novel Goose Step by Shepard Traube (1907–1983).

Plot
A man and his wife lead a German anti-Nazi propaganda literature movement. After an inadvertent betrayal, the husband is thrown into a concentration camp, from which he escapes to Switzerland.

Cast
Roland Drew as Hans Memling
Steffi Duna as Elsa Memling
Greta Granstedt as Anna Wahl
Alan Ladd as Karl Bach
Lucien Prival as Sachs
Vernon Dent as Lustig 
John Ellis as Gustav Schultz
George Rosener as Wunderlich
Bodil Rosing as Frau Kohler
Hans Heinrich von Twardowski as Storm Trooper Albert Stahlhelm 
Willy Kaufman as Herr Kohler 
Hans Joby as Hermann Lippert
Frederick Giermann as Father Pommer
Crane Whitley as Klee (as Clem Wilenchick)
Henry Zynda as Erlich (as Henry von Zynda)

Production history 
The film was the first production of Producers Releasing Corporation. It was recut and released as Beasts of Berlin the same year, having been banned in New York as too inflammatory at the time. It was also reissued in 1940 as Goose Step and in the early 1940s as Hell's Devils.

Archival footage of Adolf Hitler is included.

Selected film criticism 
Beast received mixed reviews.  The film was distributed as an anti-Nazi thriller aimed at the North American domestic market.

James G. Stahlman, political correspondent for Nashville Banner, wrote an editorial in 1939, criticizing the film for exploiting people's emotions over a serious matter – a repugnant, dangerous, dictator – in a way that clouds objectivity of the public at a critical time when force of arms may be needed. Stahlman seemed to say that using sensational propaganda to build antagonistic emotions under the guise of flag-waving public service (educating the public of the already obvious evils of Hitler) was easy money for the production, but dangerous for America (see Exploitation film and Nazi exploitation).  Propaganda vs. propaganda: a sub-irony of Stahlman's point was that the anti-Nazi propaganda film was being used to ridicule pro-Nazi propaganda related to the plot.

Release
The film was released in 1940 as Goose Step.

See also 
 Exploitation film
 Nazi exploitation
 Propaganda film
 Nazism and cinema
 History of propaganda films
 American propaganda during World War II
 Red-baiting (related term)

References

External links
 

1939 drama films
1939 films
American World War II propaganda films
Nazi exploitation films
Films directed by Sam Newfield
Producers Releasing Corporation films
Films based on American novels
Films about Nazi Germany
American black-and-white films
American war drama films
American World War II films
1940s English-language films
1930s English-language films
1930s American films